Chase the Sun is an extended play by the New Zealand band band Dragon. The EP was released in September 2011.

Upon release, band member Todd Hunter said; “We are releasing this EP because it's what we do and we love it. The band may have been around for a long time but not in this form. It's a case of old brand / new band and it's thrilling to write and play new stuff.”

Drummond continued; “During 2010 the band spent a lot of time traveling both at home [in Australia] and in New Zealand. I was determined to write some songs, so I spent my spare time in hotels and airports etc, sketching ideas and recording rough demos. I took those ideas home and played them to Bec. We talked about lyric ideas and had fun fleshing the sketches out together. Sometimes the demos were already fairly complete and we finished them off together. Other times it was Bec who brought melodies or lyric ideas for us to work on. Most of the songs evolved that way. For my part the lyrics are based on the things I feel about the world around me; the climate we're living in and the social conventions and dysfunctions that we're greeted with on a daily basis.”

The EP was launched at The Basement, Sydney on 21 July 2011.

Track listing
 "21 (Heart of Gold)" (Pete Drummond, Rebecca Drummond) – 3:37
 "Words" (P. Drummond) – 3:49
 "Chase the Sun" (P., R. Drummond) – 3:31
 "Meet Me at the End of the World" (P., R. Drummond) – 3:27
 "Mad World" (P. Drummond, R. Drummond, Bruce Reid) – 3:33

Personnel
 Todd Hunter – bass, banjo, melodica
 Mark Williams – vocals
 Pete Drummond – drums, percussion, mandolin, keyboards, guitar, vocals
 Bruce Reid – guitar, lap steel, keyboards, vocals

Release history

References

Dragon (band) albums
2011 debut EPs
EPs by Australian artists